The 1929 Penn Quakers football team was an American football team that represented the University of Pennsylvania as an independent during the 1929 college football season. In their seventh and last season under head coach Lou Young, the Quakers compiled a 7–2 record and outscored opponents by a total of 116 to 68. The team played its home games at Franklin Field in Philadelphia.

Schedule

References

Penn
Penn Quakers football seasons
Penn Quakers football